Joseph Attles (April 7, 1903 – October 29, 1990) was an American character actor of the legitimate theater, vaudeville and motion pictures.
He was born in James Island, South Carolina, United States on April 7, 1903. He died on October 29, 1990.

Theatre
Tambourines to Glory
John Henry - 1940
Porgy and Bess
Jericho-Jim Crow
King Lear - 1969
The Last of Mrs. Lincoln - 1973
Bubbling Brown Sugar - 1977

Filmography

External links

1903 births
1990 deaths
Male actors from South Carolina
American male film actors
American male stage actors
20th-century American male actors
20th-century American male singers
20th-century American singers